Pierrerue may refer to the following places in France:

Pierrerue, Alpes-de-Haute-Provence, a commune in the Alpes-de-Haute-Provence department 
Pierrerue, Hérault, a commune in the Hérault department